Românii au talent is a TV show which began airing on 18 February 2011. The project acts as a Romanian version of the franchise Got Talent, developed by Simco Limited. The show is hosted by Smiley and Pavel Bartoș, while the opening judge panel consisted of presenter Andi Moisescu, singer Andra and dancer Mihai Petre; following Petre's exclusion for the fifth season, TV presenter Mihaela Rădulescu and actor Florin Călinescu joined the panel. The winner of "Românii au talent" is awarded with €120,000.

Auditions

The auditions take place in front of the judges and a live audience at different cities across Romania and Moldova. Unlike X Factor, at any time during the audition, the judges may show disapproval to the act by pressing a buzzer which lights a large red "X" on the stage, indicating that they particularly dislike the act and do not wish the performance to continue. If all the judges press their buzzers, the act must end immediately.

Callbacks

After the auditions, the judges have to whittle almost 200 successful acts down to just 48 (in Series 1), 60 (in Series 2-6) or 50 (from Series 7 onwards). All of the performers are called back to discover if they have progressed to the live semi-finals.

Season synopses

Season 1 (2011)

The first commercials for the show were first aired in the Summer of 2010. The application process started on 2 July 2010. The judges firstly visited Constanța, Piatra Neamț, Timișoara, Bucharest and Cluj-Napoca. The show first aired on 18 February 2011.
The first episode was a big success for the ratings. Pro TV not only managed to have the biggest audience during the show, but managed to make "Romania's Got Talent" the most viewed television show since 2004 in Romania, beating its own records for the show Dansez pentru tine (Dancing with the Stars), another popular show in Romania broadcast by Pro TV.

Out of hundreds of contestants, only 200 won the local selection, having 1 or no X-es. The jury decided only 48 finalists. According to Pro TV's website, each contestant that qualified for the semifinals, were voted by the general public through text messages.
The semi-finals were broadcast in four editions: In 1 April, 2 April respectively 8–9 April 2011. In each edition, twelve contestants had to pass the juries and get as many votes from the general public in order to proceed further to the finals, the last step to the grand prize.
Twelve acts were qualified for the grand final. The votes were given only by phone or sms, the voting started after the last semifinal, stopped during the final performances, and started again after the last performance.

The award, the winner of the first season, was rapper Adrian Țuțu.

Season 2 (2012)

For the second season, ProTV kept the same team, Smiley and Pavel Bartoș presenters, Andra, Mihai Petre and Andi Moisescu jurors. The season started with a bigger audience than the first. The first episode from auditions had a 21.8 rating, compared to 18 points for the similar episode of the first season.
The auditions were extended to six cities. Constanța, Timișoara, Bucharest and Cluj-Napoca were kept, and Iași and Craiova were added. The auditions took place between August and September 2011.
The first episode was broadcast on 17 February and it was again a big hit for ProTV. They decided to air seven auditions episodes, instead of six for the first season. Also, the number of contestants qualified for the semifinals was extended from 48 to 60. There were five semifinals, three acts from each semifinal qualified for the final, two voted via phone or sms and the third voted by the jurors.
Comparing to the first season, the second had three more acts in the final, the total number being 15. The voting system was kept, the lines were opened after the last semifinal, closed during the final performances, and opened again after the last performance in the final.

The winner of the second season, was magician Cristian Gog.

Season 3 (2013)

Auditions for the third season of Romania's Got Talent were in summer 2012.  The first episode brought the highest audience for a debut of a season registered so far, over five million viewers per minute.

The winner of the third season, was dog trainer Bruno Icobeț.

Season 4 (2014)

Season 5 (2015)

Final (12 June)

Originality prize winner: Cosmin Cioca

Season 6 (2016)

Final (3 June)

Season 7 (2017)

Final (2 June)

Originality prize winner: Eduard Antal

Season 8 (2018)

Final (1 June)

Series summary

Series Overview

Overall ratings summary
The first episode was a big success for the ratings. Pro TV not only managed to have the biggest audience during the show, but managed to make "Romania's Got Talent" the most viewed television show since 2004 in Romania, beating its own records for the show Dansez pentru tine (Dancing with the Stars), another popular show in Romania broadcast by Pro TV.

Notes 
 Laura Bretan qualified directly into the final without being in the semifinals.

References

 
Romanian reality television series
Romanian television series based on British television series